The Phyllocephalinae are a subfamily of shield bugs erected by Amyot and Serville in 1843.

Tribes and genera
BioLib lists the following genera in four tribes:

Cressonini
Auth.: Kamaluddin & Ahmad, 1991
 Cressona Dallas, 1851
 Kafubu Schouteden, 1962
 Lamtoplax Linnavuori, 1982
 Melampodius Distant, 1901
 Nimboplax Linnavuori, 1982
 Uddmania Bergroth, 1915

Megarrhamphini

Auth.: Ahmad, 1981
 Bakerorandolotus Ahmad & Kamaluddin, 1978
 Megarrhamphus Bergroth, 1891
 Randolotus Distant, 1902

Phyllocephalini
Auth.: Amyot & Serville, 1843

 Basicryptus Herrich-Schäffer, 1844
 Borrichias Distant, 1910
 Chalcopis Kirkaldy, 1909
 Dalsira Amyot & Serville, 1843
 Delocephalus Distant, 1881
 Dichelorhinus Stål, 1853
 Diplorhinus Amyot & Serville, 1843
 Eonymia Linnavuori, 1982
 Frisimelica Distant, 1900
 Gonopsimorpha Yang, 1934
 Gonopsis Amyot & Serville, 1843
 Jayma Rider, 1998
 Kaffraria Kirkaldy, 1909
 Katongoplax Linnavuori, 1982
 Lobopeltista Schouteden, 1905
 Macrina Amyot & Serville, 1843
 Magwamba Distant, 1910
 Mercatus Distant, 1902
 Metocryptus Linnavuori, 1982
 Minchamia Gross, 1976
 Nazeeriana Ahmad & Kamaluddin, 1978
 Neoschyzops Ahmad & Kamaluddin, 1990
 Penedalsira Linnavuori, 1982
 Phyllocephala Laporte, 1833
 Roebournea Schouteden, 1906
 Salvianus Distant, 1902
 Sandehana Distant, 1898
 Schismatops Dallas, 1851
 Schyzops Spinola, 1837
 Storthogaster Karsch, 1892
 Tantia Distant, 1910
 Tshibalaka Schouteden, 1963

Tetrodini
Auth.: Ahmad, 1981
 Gellia Stål, 1865
 Tetroda Amyot & Serville, 1843
 Tetrodias Kirkaldy, 1909

unplaced genera
 Thalagmus Stål

References

External links
 
 
 Images of Phyllocephala volxemii at the Swedish Museum of Natural History

Pentatomidae
Hemiptera subfamilies
Shield bugs